Sparganopseustis garlaczi is a species of moth of the family Tortricidae. It is found in Cotopaxi Province, Ecuador.

The wingspan is 26 mm. The forewings are brownish orange in the costal half of the wing, more cream in the subterminal area and browner along the costa. The hindwings are whitish cream.

Etymology
The species is named in honour of Dr. Rafał Garlacz who collected the species.

References

Moths described in 2008
Sparganothini
Moths of South America
Taxa named by Józef Razowski